Carlin is a unisex given name and surname of Irish origin. As a feminine given name, a secondary origin is as an alternate form of  Carla, Carol or Caroline. Notable people with the name include:

Surname

 Ben Carlin (1912–1981), Australian adventurer and engineer
 Bertinazzi (1710–1783), actor and author, also known as Carlin
 Bob Carlin (born 1953), musician
 Brian Carlin (born 1950), baseball player
 Charles Creighton Carlin (1866-1938), politician
 Clay Carlin (1989–2007), fictional character
 Daniel Carlin (born 1959), doctor
 Dan Carlin (born 1965), political commentator
 Dave Carlin, politician
 David Carlin (born 1938), politician and sociologist
 Dermot Carlin, football player
 Gavin Carlin (born 1985), Irish darts player
 George Carlin (1937–2008), comedian and social critic
 Glen Carlin, fictional character
 John Carlin (disambiguation), multiple people
 John Carlin (actor) (1929–2017) Scottish actor.

 John Carlin (businessman) (born 1955), American entrepreneur, art historian and record producer
 John Carlin (footballer) (1871–?), English footballer for Liverpool F.C.
 John Carlin (journalist) (born 1956), journalist and author
 John Carlin (umpire) (1861–1944), cricketer and test umpire
 John P. Carlin, Assistant Attorney General for Justice National Security Division
 John W. Carlin (born 1940), governor of Kansas, 1979–1987, and Archivist of the United States, 1995–2005
 Leo Carlin (born 1937), American football businessman
 Leo P. Carlin (1908–1999), mayor
 Luke Carlin (born 1980), baseball player
 Lynn Carlin (born 1938), actress
 Martin Carlin (c.1730–1785), cabinetmaker
 Máiréad Carlin (born 1988), singer
 Mary Carlin Yates (born 1946), civil servant
 Mike Carlin (born 1958), comic book writer and editor
 Patrick Carlin (1832–1895), recipient of the Victoria Cross
 Paul N. Carlin, civil servant
 Phillips Carlin (1894–1971), broadcaster and executive
 Robert Carlin (1901–1991), union organizer and politician
 Sean Carlin (born 1967), hammer thrower
 Spencer Carlin, fictional character
 Sydney Carlin (disambiguation), multiple people
 Trevor Carlin, racing team owner
 Vince Carlin, civil servant
 Willie Carlin (born 1940), football player
 William P. Carlin (1829–1903), Army General

Given name
 Carlin Glynn (born 1940), American actress
 Carlin Hartman (born 1972), American basketball coach
 Carlin Hudson (born 1996), American soccer player
 Carlin Isles (born 1989), American rugby sevens player
 Carlin Itonga (born 1982), Congolese football player
 Carlin Meyer (born 1948), American professor
 Carlin Romano, American literary critic
 Carlin Craig Woodruff Jr., known as Carlos Morales (actor), Filipino actor and director
 Carlin Yoder, American politician

See also

 Carli (given name)
 Carlie
 Carlina (name)
 Carlini (name)
 Carlino (name)
 Carlien Dirkse van den Heuvel
 Carlon
Charlin (name)